The National University of Computer and Emerging Sciences (Initials: NUCES), also commonly known as "Foundation for Advancement of Science and Technology" (FAST), is a private research university with multiple campuses in different cities of Pakistan.

Overview 
The university is the first multi-campus university in Pakistan, having five modern campuses based in different cities. These campuses are located in Chiniot-Faisalabad, Islamabad, Karachi, Lahore and Peshawar, providing a standard educational environment and recreational facilities to 11,000 students, out of which 500 are faculty members and a quarter is covered by female students. Founded as Federally Chartered University, it was inaugurated by President Pervez Musharraf in July 2000. It is consistently ranked among the leading institutions of higher education in the country and ranked top in computer sciences and information technology by the Higher Education Commission of Pakistan in 2020. Its engineering programs are accredited with Pakistan Engineering Council. FAST claims to be a not-for-profit educational institution charging subsidized fees from its students. Besides this, FAST offers different financial assistance programs for deserving students in the form of loans.

History
The Foundation of Advancement of Science and Technology was founded and established by Bank of Credit and Commerce International financier. Hasan Abidi, founder of BCCI, provided a large financial capital for the university to promote research in computer sciences and emerging technologies during 1980s. Later this foundation established the National University of Computer and Emerging Sciences which was inaugurated by Former President and Chief of Army Staff General Pervez Musharraf in 2000. It is privileged to be the first private sector university, having multiple campuses set up under the Federal Charter granted by Ordinance No.XXIII of 2000, dated July 1, 2000.

Established in 1980, the sponsoring body of FAST university was registered by Government of Pakistan as a charitable institution. FAST was a pioneer in Pakistan's IT sector development by offering the country's first undergraduate computer science curriculum, with its headquarters at Islamabad.

Campuses 
National University of Computer and Emerging Sciences is a premier university in Pakistan, with a multi-campus setup and its central administration based in Islamabad. The university operates five campuses in Islamabad, Karachi, Lahore, Peshawar, and Faisalabad, making it the first of its kind in the country.

Islamabad Campus 
The FAST National University Islamabad campus, situated at A.K Brohi Road, H-11/4, serves as the university's main hub.

This campus provides state-of-the-art lecture halls and classrooms, extensive libraries and research centers, student housing, dining and recreational facilities, athletic fields, student clubs and organizations, and more. Additionally, the campus provides a range of support services, such as health and wellness resources, academic advising, and career guidance.

At the heart of these offerings is the Career Services Office, which provides students and alumni with a variety of career development support, including workshops, seminars, career counseling, mock interviews, and recruitment drives for internships and jobs. The campus also hosts an annual job fair and provides opportunities for alumni engagement through events such as alumni talks and the annual homecoming.

Karachi Campus 
The FAST National University Karachi campus has two branches: the main campus, located on the National Highway, and the city campus, located in Block-6 PECHS.

At the Karachi campus, students have access to state-of-the-art labs, well-equipped to support their studies in a variety of technical fields. They are also able to take advantage of a variety of study and research resources through libraries.

In addition to its academic facilities, the Karachi campus offers a range of recreational and wellness services, including sports facilities and a gym. Additionally, the campus provides transportation services to support the mobility of its students.

Lahore Campus 
The FAST National University Lahore campus is situated in Faisal Town and spans 12.5 acres of land.

At the Lahore campus, students have access to a variety of indoor and outdoor sporting facilities, including football, volleyball, badminton, cricket, basketball, lawn tennis, table tennis, and jogging. Swimming, rowing, and athletics are also available through off-campus arrangements.

In addition to its athletic facilities, the Lahore campus provides students with purpose-built classrooms equipped with cutting-edge technology, as well as a range of computing and engineering laboratories. The campus also houses an auditorium, a seminar hall, a cafeteria, and separate common rooms for boys and girls. The offices of various student groups can also be found on the campus.

The Lahore campus library is a standout feature of the university, as it is the second library in Pakistan with its library catalog accessible through the Library of Congress Gateway. The library holds over 21,000 books and 57 international journals and magazines.

Peshawar Campus 
The Peshawar campus of the FAST National University is for students seeking an education in technical fields. It is located in the heart of the city.

At the Peshawar campus, students can pursue degree programs in Computer Science, Electrical Engineering, and Business Administration, taught by a dedicated and highly qualified faculty.

Chiniot-Faisalabad Campus 
The Faisalabad campus of the FAST National University is the fifth and newest addition to the university's network of campuses. It is located on 22 acres of land on the Faisalabad-Chiniot Road, approximately nine kilometers from the Faisalabad Motorway interchange.

The Faisalabad campus offers degree programs in Computer Science, Electrical Engineering, and Business Administration.

Academic Profile 
FAST university offers undergraduate, post-graduate and doctoral programs in business and sciences, at their campuses. The availability of bachelor programs depend on the campuses.

Undergraduate Studies 
The undergraduate courses are offered by university in different disciplines for bachelor's in sciences and business, leading to a bachelor's degree.

Faculty of Computing 
Dean: Jawwad Shamsi

Degrees offered:
 BS (Artificial Intelligence)
 BS (Computer Science)
 BS (Cyber Security)
 BS (Data Science)
 BS (Software Engineering)

Faculty of Engineering 
Dean: Dr Saima Zafar

Degrees offered:

 BS (Civil Engineering)
 BS (Electrical Engineering)
 BS (Internet of Things)
 BS (Robotics)

Faculty of Management Sciences 
Dean: M. Ayub Siddiqui

Degrees offered:

 BBA (4 years)
 BS (Accounting and Finance) (4 years)
 BS (Business Analytics) (4 years)

Graduate Studies 
The university offers post graduate studies for different disciplines for master's in sciences and business, leading to a master's degree.

Faculty of Computing 
Dean: Jawwad Shamsi

Degrees offered:

 MS (Artificial intelligence}
 MS (Computer Networks & Security
 MS (Computer Science)
 MS (Data Science)
 MS (Software Engineering)
 MS (Software Project Management)

Faculty of Engineering 
Dean: S.M Sajid

Degrees offered:

 MS (Civil Engineering)
 MS (Electrical Engineering)

Faculty of Management Sciences 
Dean: M. Ayub Siddiqui

Degrees offered:

 MBA (2 years)
 MS (Accounting and Finance) (2 years)
 MS (Management Sciences) (2 years)

Faculty of Science & Humanities 
Dean: Dr.Summaira Sarfraz

Degrees offered:

 MS (Applied in linguistics)
 MS (Mathematics)

Doctor of philosophy 
Degrees offered:

 PhD (Civil Engineering)
 PhD (Computer Science)
 PhD (Electrical Engineering)
 PhD (Management Sciences)
 PhD (Mathematics)
 PhD (Software Engineering)

Notable alumni
 Farhan Saeed - singer, actor
 Fawad Khan – singer, actor
 Hania Amir – actress, model, singer
 Mir Zafar Ali – visual effects artist who won an Academy Award for the animated film Frozen (2013)
 Osman Khalid Butt – actor
 Xulfi – musician, singer, music producer, song composer

Research labs 
FAST-National university encourages the growth of research in university. It has its research labs in four campuses, Islamabad, Lahore, Peshawar and Karachi.

References

External links
 Official website
 Karachi Campus
 Islamabad Campus
 Lahore Campus
 Peshawar Campus
 Faisalabad Campus

FAST University Merit List 2023

{{Fast University Jobs 2023}}

Educational institutions established in 2000
2000 establishments in Pakistan
Programming contests
Private universities and colleges in Pakistan
Engineering universities and colleges in Pakistan
Private universities and colleges in Khyber Pakhtunkhwa
Computer science institutes in Pakistan
Universities and colleges in Lahore
Universities and colleges in Peshawar
Bank of Credit and Commerce International
Universities and colleges in Islamabad
Universities and colleges in Punjab, Pakistan